The following is a list of episodes of the TLC reality television series Toddlers & Tiaras.

Series overview

Episodes

Season 1 (2009)

Season 2 (2009–2010)

Season 3 (2010–2011)

Season 4 (2011)

Season 5 (2012–2013)

Season 6 (2013)

Season 7 (2016)

References

External links
 
 
 Authentic Entertainment's Official Site

Lists of American non-fiction television series episodes
Lists of American reality television series episodes